Events from the year 1885 in Russia.

Incumbents
 Monarch – Alexander III

Events

 
 
  
  
 Kharkiv Polytechnic Institute
 Nobles' Land Bank
 Radishchev Art Museum
 Private Opera

Births

Deaths

References

1885 in Russia
Years of the 19th century in the Russian Empire